State Highway 394 (SH 394) is a  state highway in Moffat County, Colorado, United States. SH 394's western terminus is at U.S. Route 40/Colorado State Highway 13 (US 40/SH 13) in Craig, and the eastern terminus is at the Moffat–Routt county line.

Route description

SH 394 begins in Craig at the intersection of Ranney Street and West Victory Way (carrying westbound US 40/SH 13). From its western terminus SH 394 proceeds south on Ranney Street for one block before crossing the eastbound direction of the US 40/SH 13 one-way pair that runs along West 4th Street. About another block south, the highway crosses a set of railroad tracks and leaves the city limits of Craig.

Roughly  farther south the highway turns east at an intersection with County Road 107 (CR 107), which continues south, on the southern edge of a small oxbow lake of the Yampa River. East of CR 107, SH  heads easterly, roughly parallel US 40.

The highway ends at the county line between Moffat County and Routt County, southeast of Dresher Reservoir. The road continues easterly from SH 294's western terminus as County Road 65 in Routt County to rejoin US 40 in Hayden.

Major intersections

See also

 List of state highways in Colorado

References

External links

394
Transportation in Moffat County, Colorado